Elias James Manning OFM Conv. (14 April 1938 – 13 October 2019) was an American-born Brazilian Roman Catholic bishop. He served as bishop of the Roman Catholic Diocese of Valença, Brazil, from 1990 to 2014.

Personal life
Manning was born in Troy, New York, and had a brother and a sister. He attended La Salle Institute, after graduating in 1959 instead of attending college he decided to attend St. Anthony-on-Hudson Seminary in Rensselaer. During his time in seminary he served on a mission trip to Puerto Rico, which inspired him to become a missionary and join the Conventual Franciscans. After graduating from seminary and being ordained in 1965 Manning traveled to Brazil where he would spend his life as a Franciscan priest and missionary. In 1990 he was appointed bishop of the diocese of Valença. Manning died on 13 October 2019 at the age of 81.

Notes

1938 births
2019 deaths
American expatriate Roman Catholic bishops in South America
20th-century Roman Catholic bishops in Brazil
Conventual Franciscan bishops
People from Troy, New York
American Roman Catholic missionaries
Roman Catholic missionaries in Brazil
American emigrants to Brazil
21st-century Roman Catholic bishops in Brazil
Roman Catholic bishops of Valença